The 1923 Massachusetts Aggies football team represented Massachusetts Agricultural College in the 1923 college football season. The team was coached by Harold Gore and played its home games at Alumni Field in Amherst, Massachusetts. Massachusetts finished the season with a record of 2–5. The Aggies were charter members of the newly established New England Conference, although they did not face any in-conference opponents this season.

Schedule

References

Massachusetts
UMass Minutemen football seasons
Massachusetts Aggies football